Thomas Fiennes, 8th Baron Dacre (1472 – 9 September 1534) was an English peer and soldier, the son of Sir John Fiennes.

Career 
He was born in 1472, the son of Sir John Fiennes (born c.1447, son of Richard Fiennes, 7th Baron Dacre born 1415) and Alice FitzHugh. By his mother, he was a cousin to Sir Thomas Parr, father of future queen consort Catherine Parr. He had one sister, Anne, Marchioness Berkeley (died 10 September 1497), who married secondly to Sir Thomas Brandon. On 8 March 1486, he succeeded as 8th Baron Dacre upon the death of his grandmother Joan Dacre, the suo jure 7th Baroness Dacre. He was also known as Baron Dacre of the South owing to his family seat of Herstmonceux Castle being in the county of Sussex.

In 1493, one year after his marriage, he was appointed Constable of Calais. He was invested as a Knight of the Bath in 1494. In 1497, he fought in the Battle of Blackheath where he helped defeat the Cornish.

Marriage and issue 
In about 1492, he married Anne Bourchier, the daughter of Sir Humphrey Bourchier and Elizabeth Tilney. The marriage produced three sons and a daughter:
 Sir Thomas Fiennes (died 26 October 1528), married in 1514, Jane Sutton, daughter of Edward Sutton, 2nd Baron Dudley, and Cicely Willoughby, by whom he had one son, Thomas Fiennes, 9th Baron Dacre and a daughter Anne who married John Mantell. The 9th Baron and his brother-in-law Mantell were hanged for the murder of John Busbridge in 1541.
 John Fiennes (b.1497)
 Thomas Fiennes
 Mary Fiennes (1495–1531), married Henry Norris, by whom she had issue.

Death 
He died on 9 September 1534 at the age of 62. He was succeeded by his eldest grandson, Thomas Fiennes, as his sons had predeceased him.

The tomb set up for the 8th Baron Dacre and his son at All Saints Church, Herstmonceux, known as the Dacre Tomb, is thought to have made use of effigies from an older monument intended for Thomas Hoo, Baron Hoo and Hastings (1396-1455) and his younger half-brother, also Sir Thomas Hoo (born 1416). This was shown when the monument was restored, and it was found that the original arms shown on the tabards of the figures were those of Hoo. It is conjectured that the Hoo tomb may have been at Battle Abbey, which was sold in 1539 and dismantled soon afterwards.

Gallery

Ancestry

References

Sources

Thomas
1472 births
1534 deaths
15th-century English people
16th-century English nobility
Knights of the Bath
People from Herstmonceux
Thomas
8